Roscoe Tanner was the defending champion and won in the final 6–4, 6–2 against Brian Gottfried.

Seeds

  Jimmy Connors (quarterfinals)
  Björn Borg (first round)
  John McEnroe (second round)
  Harold Solomon (semifinals)
  Brian Gottfried (final)
  Raúl Ramirez (first round)
 n/a
  Roscoe Tanner (champion)
  Sandy Mayer (second round)
  José Higueras (third round)
  Tim Gullikson (first round)
  Wojciech Fibak (quarterfinals)
  Adriano Panatta (first round)
  Dick Stockton (third round)
  Stan Smith (second round)
 n/a

Draw

Finals

Top half

Section 1

Section 2

Bottom half

Section 3

Section 4

References

External links
 1979 Congoleum Classic Draw - Men's singles

Congoleum Classic - Singles